The electoral district of Tarneit is an electoral district of the Victorian Legislative Assembly. It was created before the 2002 election where it replaced the seat of Werribee.

The seat is located in the south western suburbs of Melbourne, including Tarneit, Williams Landing, Truganina  and the eastern parts of Hoppers Crossing. It is a safe seat for the Labor Party with a current margin of 14.6%.

The first member for the seat, elected in 2002, was Mary Gillett, formerly member for abolished Werribee. She was defeated for Labor preselection for the 2006 election by Tim Pallas, then chief of staff to Premier Steve Bracks. Following an electoral redistribution for the 2014 election, Pallas moved to the recreated seat of Werribee, and Telmo Languiller, formerly member for abolished Derrimut, replaced him in Tarneit.

Members for Tarneit

Election results

References

External links
 Electorate profile: Tarneit District, Victorian Electoral Commission

2002 establishments in Australia
Electoral districts of Victoria (Australia)
City of Wyndham
Electoral districts and divisions of Greater Melbourne